Raymond Thomas Dowker (6 July 1919 – 17 December 2004) was a New Zealand cricketer who played first-class cricket for Canterbury between 1949 and 1957.

A right-handed batsman, Dowker played 24 games – scoring 1,147 runs at 30.18 including one century, 122 against Auckland on 7 January 1955. Born in New Brighton, in Christchurch, Canterbury, New Zealand, he was one of the New Zealand Cricket Almanack Players of the Year for 1955. With 366 runs at an average of 45.75, he was the highest scorer in the Plunket Shield in the 1954–55 season. In 1955-56 he captained Canterbury to outright victory in all four of their Plunket Shield matches, thus winning the trophy.

Dowker was also a successful football player and won the 1945 Chatham Cup with Western AFC. He went on to represent Canterbury at football in 1948.

His grandsons have also been successful in New Zealand sport. The sons of his daughter Catherine Wheeler (née Dowker), Joe Wheeler and Ben Wheeler, have played Rugby and cricket respectively for regional and national teams.

References

External links

1919 births
2004 deaths
Cricketers from Christchurch
New Zealand cricketers
Canterbury cricketers